The Una do Prelado River is a river in the state of São Paulo, Brazil.

Course

The Una do Prelado River is the largest in the  Juréia-Itatins Ecological Station, a strictly protected area of well-preserved Atlantic Forest created in 1986.
It rises in the Banhado Grande region to the south-west of the Serra da Juréia, and meanders in a north-east direction parallel to the Atlantic coast for  through a low plain between the Serra dos Itatins and the Serra da Juréia. Its main tributary is the Cacunduva River.

The final section in the east divides the Juréia-Itatins Ecological Station from the Itinguçu State Park, a  conservation unit created in 2006.
Near the sea the river separates into two branches which later recombine, enclosing the Ilha do Ameixal, which holds the Ilha do Ameixal Area of Relevant Ecological Interest.
The Barra do Una lies at the river mouth, in the municipality of Peruíbe, the centre of the Barra do Una Sustainable Development Reserve.

The Una do Prelado River is a blackwater river fed by various streams from the north side of the Serra da Juréia and the Atlantic side of the Serra dos Itatins.

See also
List of rivers of São Paulo

References

Sources

Rivers of São Paulo (state)